Sonja Kirchberger (born 9 November 1964 in Vienna, Austria) is an Austrian actress.

From  1974 to 1978  she was a dancer in the Ballet of the Opera in Vienna (Wiener Oper). 
She became popular to the European public as Coco, a sensuous but dangerous seductress in the 1988 German  blockbuster .
Till now she was to be seen in about 40 movies, some Italian and French productions, and English  in Seven Servants (1996) by Daryush Shokof with Anthony Quinn, but mostly in German TV/cinema.

Sonja Kirchberger is mother of a girl and a boy.

Partial filmography 
  (1988), as Coco
 Peter Strohm: Einsteins Tod (1991, TV), as Anita Claasen
  ( Sisi und der Kaiserkuss, 1991), as Néné
  (1991, TV film), as Inge Bauer
 The True Story About Men and Women (1992), as Eva
  (1993), as Mistress in Munich
  (1993), as Barbara Latouche
 Anwalt Abel: Rufmord (1994, TV), as Stella
  (1996, TV film), as Iris
  (1996), as Madeleine
 Seven Servants (1996), as Maid
 Tanz auf dem Vulkan (1996, TV miniseries), as Olga
 Un prete tra noi: La sindrome di Stoccolma (1997, TV), as Claudia Gruber
  (1998, TV miniseries), as Lajana
 Gigolo – Bei Anruf Liebe (1998, TV film), as Lisa
 In fondo al cuore (1998, TV film), as Carla
 Benzin im Blut (1999, TV series, 14 episodes), as Jeannine Jourdan
 Kill Me Softly – Frauenmord in Frankfurt (2000, TV film), as Police Inspector Anna Göllner
 Die Liebende ( Blutsbande, 2000, TV film), as Mona
 Der Runner (2000, TV film), as Danielle Reuter
  (2000, TV film), as Cora Talheim
  (2001, TV film), as Kundrie
 Umwege des Herzens (2001, TV film), as Sarah von Wytersheim
  (2003, TV film), as Police Inspector Anna Göllner
 Das böse Mädchen (2003, TV film), as Police Inspector Anna Göllner
 Die Bienen – Tödliche Bedrohung (2008, TV film), as Susanna Bergmann
  (2009, TV film), as Evil Queen
 Sources of Life (2013), as Marie Freytag
  (2013, TV film), as Emmy Hartwig
 Tom Sawyer & Huckleberry Finn (2014), as Widow Douglas
 Gut zu Vögeln (2016), as Sonja

References

External links
Official homepage

1964 births
Living people
Austrian film actresses
Austrian television actresses
20th-century Austrian actresses
21st-century Austrian actresses
Actresses from Vienna
Ich bin ein Star – Holt mich hier raus! participants